Hamataliwa helia is a species of lynx spider in the family Oxyopidae. It is found in the United States, Mexico, Guyana, Thailand, Malaysia (Sarawak), Brunei, and Indonesia (Sumatra).

References

Oxyopidae
Articles created by Qbugbot
Spiders described in 1929